The initials SFIO can stand for:
The Section Française de l'Internationale Ouvrière (French Section of the Workers' International), a former French Socialist Party
The Sfio Safe/Fast String/File I/O library from AT&T Labs Research